The Super League Tri-series was an international rugby league football tournament contested in 1997 between Queensland, New South Wales, and New Zealand representative rugby league teams. It was run by the breakaway Super League organisation as an alternative to the Australian Rugby League's traditional State of Origin series, with each of the two series involving exclusively players contracted to clubs of their respective League. New South Wales were overall winners of the Tri-series, defeating Queensland in the final.

New Zealand restricted their selections to players based in Australia and New Zealand and did not recognize the matches as international games.

Results

Game 1

Game 2

Game 3

After New South Wales defeated Queensland on 11 April 1997 it was possible for New Zealand to make the final if they defeated New South Wales. This commercially disastrous final looked like becoming a reality when New Zealand winger Sean Hoppe scored a try in the dying minutes of the 14 May match against New South Wales, but the try was controversially disallowed.

Table

Final
The Tri-series final was held on 19 May 1997, and won by New South Wales, who defeated Queensland 23–22 at ANZ Stadium in the longest-ever game of first class rugby league. After 80 minutes, the scores were locked at 18–18, and a further 20 minutes were played. At the end of this time, the scores were 22–22, and Queensland captain Allan Langer is said to have asked the referee, "Should we toss a coin to see who wins?" The game then moved into golden point extra time, and after 104 minutes, Noel Goldthorpe kicked a field goal for New South Wales, and won the match.

Despite the game being played in Brisbane, NSW were the home team as it was the Final of the series.

Squads

New South Wales 
Coach:Tim Sheens
Assistant Coach: Craig Bellamy

New Zealand
The side was coached by Graeme Norton and he served as a selector alongside Frank Endacott and Gary Kemble.

Queensland
Queensland were coached by Wayne Bennett.

Statistics

Try scorers

See also
 1997 State of Origin series
 Super League (Australia)

References

External links
Complete Statistics and Players of the Super League Tri-Series
Super League Tri-Series 1997 at rugbyleagueproject.org

Super League
1997 in Australian rugby league
1997 in New Zealand rugby league